This is a list of listed buildings in North Lanarkshire. The list is split out by parish.

 List of listed buildings in Airdrie, North Lanarkshire
 List of listed buildings in Bothwell, North Lanarkshire
 List of listed buildings in Cadder, North Lanarkshire
 List of listed buildings in Cambusnethan, North Lanarkshire
 List of listed buildings in Coatbridge, North Lanarkshire
 List of listed buildings in Cumbernauld, North Lanarkshire
 List of listed buildings in Kilsyth, North Lanarkshire
 List of listed buildings in Motherwell And Wishaw, North Lanarkshire
 List of listed buildings in New Monkland, North Lanarkshire
 List of listed buildings in Old Monkland, North Lanarkshire
 List of listed buildings in Shotts, North Lanarkshire

See also
 List of Category A listed buildings in North Lanarkshire

External links

North Lanarkshire